Philip Röhe (born 25 April 1994) is a German footballer who plays for Oberliga Westfalen club 1. FC Gievenbeck.

Club career
He made his 3. Liga debut for Preußen Münster in October 2013, as a substitute for Dennis Grote in a 4–0 win over Chemnitzer FC.

External links

1994 births
Living people
German footballers
Association football fullbacks
SC Preußen Münster players
3. Liga players
Oberliga (football) players
FC Eintracht Rheine players